Sauk City is a village in Sauk County, Wisconsin, United States. The population was 3,518 as of the 2020 census. The first incorporated village in the state, the community was founded by Agoston Haraszthy and his business partner, Robert Bryant. The village is adjacent to Prairie du Sac; together, these twin villages are referred to as Sauk Prairie.

History

Impressed by the beautiful scenery, Agoston Haraszthy, a charismatic Hungarian sometimes called "Count" Haraszthy, purchased a small plot of land along the Wisconsin River in 1840. Later, with his English-born business partner, Robert Bryant, Haraszthy bought additional land and founded the town of Haraszthy (originally called Széptáj, Hungarian for "beautiful place").

In 1849, the name of the town was changed to Westfield. Three years later, in 1852, it was changed again, this time to the current name of Sauk City. The community was incorporated as a village in 1854, making Sauk City the oldest incorporated village in the state.

In 1852, German immigrants founded the Sauk City Free Congregation (Freie Gemeinde). This group, a liberal religious society, celebrated German music, literature, and culture. It met in a private home until 1884, when Park Hall was built as a meeting house. The building is now home to the Sauk County Free Congregation, a Unitarian Universalist fellowship.

In the Harper's Weekly magazine of November 21, 1914, Sauk City was named "America's Foremost City". The article cited a pageant, attended by 4000 people, which enacted scenes from the village's history, and concluded with the naming of the school principal as the Civic Secretary, charged with making the school the center of the life of the town. To that end, the ballot box was transferred from the town hall to the school house.

On August 28, 1977, Sauk City made national headlines when, during setup for an upcoming circus performance, a fully-grown elephant escaped and stampeded through the village‘s nearby nursing home, completely destroying the ceiling in one of the main hallways. Despite the damage, no one was injured as the incident took place during lunchtime when the residents were in their rooms or the dining area, which the elephant did not enter.

Geography
Sauk City is located at  (43.274130, -89.728310).

Demographics

2020 census
As of the census of 2020, the population was 3,518. The racial makeup of the village was 89.3% White, 0.5% Black or African American, 0.5% Asian, 0.4% Native American, 3.3% from other races, and 6.0% from two or more races. Ethnically, the population was 7.0% Hispanic or Latino of any race.

2010 census
As of the census of 2010, there were 3,410 people, 1,431 households, and 871 families living in the village. The racial makeup of the village was 94.6% White, 0.2% African American, 0.9% Native American, 0.4% Asian, 2.8% from other races, and 1.1% from two or more races. Hispanic or Latino of any race were 5.0% of the population.

Out of a total of 1,431 households, 31.7% had children under the age of 18 living with them, 45.2% were married couples living together, 10.2% had a female householder with no husband present, 5.5% had a male householder with no wife present, and 39.1% were non-families. 32.8% of all households were made up of individuals, and 13.8% had someone living alone who was 65 years of age or older. The average household size was 2.30 and the average family size was 2.93.

The median age in the village was 39.3 years. 23.8% of residents were under the age of 18; 7% were between the ages of 18 and 24; 27.2% were from 25 to 44; 24.9% were from 45 to 64; and 17.2% were 65 years of age or older. The gender makeup of the village was 47.2% male and 52.8% female.

2000 census
As of the census of 2000, there were 3,109 residents, 1,285 households, and 796 families living in the village. The population density was 2,078.0 people per square mile (800.3/km2). There were 1,314 housing units at an average density of 878.3 per square mile (338.2/km2). The racial makeup of the village was 97.01% White, 0.39% African American, 0.23% Native American, 0.19% Asian, 1.45% from other races, and 0.74% from two or more races. Hispanic or Latino of any race were 3.76% of the population.

Out of a total of 1,285 households, 30.8% had children under the age of 18 living with them, 49.8% were married couples living together, 8.7% had a female householder with no husband present, and 38.0% were non-families. 32.5% of all households were made up of individuals, and 14.6% had someone living alone who was 65 years of age or older. The average household size was 2.33 and the average family size was 2.99.

In the village, the population was spread out, with 24.2% under the age of 18, 7.5% from 18 to 24, 29.9% from 25 to 44, 19.2% from 45 to 64, and 19.3% who were 65 years of age or older. The median age was 38 years. For every 100 females, there were 92.4 males. For every 100 females age 18 and over, there were 87.3 males.

The median income for a household in the village was $36,378, and the median income for a family was $45,156. Males had a median income of $29,908 versus $22,996 for females. The per capita income for the village was $17,705. About 10.0% of families and 12.5% of the population were below the poverty line, including 18.4% of those under age 18 and 17.6% of those age 65 or over.

Economy

Sauk City is the site of the first Culver's restaurant, which opened July 18, 1984.  Culver's corporate headquarters are located in neighboring Prairie du Sac.

In 1939, Arkham House, a firm devoted to preserving in print the work of H. P. Lovecraft and other dark fantasists, was founded by August Derleth and Donald Wandrei in Sauk City, where the firm continues to be headquartered.

Cuca Records was founded by James Kirchstein in 1959 and was located on Water Street next to Kirchstein's Super Market (founded by James's father, Frank Kirchstein, which was in business from the 1930s to 1982 and featured polka music on 8-track tapes in the store).  Cuca Records produced records until the early 1970s, including polka, folk, and jazz.

On June 19, 2013 , Capital Brewery, headquartered in Middleton, WI, announced plans to expand their operations with a new primary brewing facility which was to have opened in Sauk City in the summer of 2014. The planned facility was to have an initial capacity of 100,000 barrels per year at a cost of an estimated US$11 million (equivalent to $ million in ).

Sauk City is also where Jacob Leinenkugel of the Leinenkugel Brewing Company was born and raised.

Other information
Sauk City is adjacent to Prairie du Sac, located directly to the north. Both communities are located on the west bank of the Wisconsin River. They share a municipal boundary, as well as a school system, police department, and hospital, but have separate fire departments and libraries. Efforts have been made to join the two villages into a single entity, Sauk Prairie, but these have failed because of tax differences between the communities.

Sauk Prairie High School, located in Prairie du Sac, serves the villages of Sauk City and Prairie du Sac. The school's mascot is the eagle, so named because of the population of eagles found on the Wisconsin River adjacent to Sauk Prairie.

Notable people

 August Derleth, author and publisher
 Agoston Haraszthy, traveler, writer, and pioneer winemaker
 Greg Jensen, former NFL player
 Robert J. Keller, former Wisconsin State Representative
 Cyrus Leland, attorney and state assemblyman
 Emanuel L. Philipp, former Governor of Wisconsin
 John B. Quimby, former Wisconsin State Senator
 Mark Schorer, author, professor
 Scott Schutt, former NFL player

Images

Buildings and structures
 Badger Army Ammunition Plant
 Cuca Records
 Freethinkers' Hall
 Lachmund Family House

See also
Sauk County, Wisconsin

References

External links

 Village of Sauk City website
 Sauk Prairie Area Historical Society
 Sauk Prairie Chamber of Commerce
 Sanborn fire insurance maps: 1892 1900 1915

Villages in Sauk County, Wisconsin
Villages in Wisconsin
1840 establishments in Wisconsin Territory
Populated places established in 1840